True Western Hearts is a 1914 American silent short Western film directed by J. Russell O'Leary. The film stars Sydney Ayres, Helen Armstrong, Jacques Jaccard, Louise Lester, Joseph Knight, Jack Richardson, and Harry von Meter.

External links
 

1914 films
1914 Western (genre) films
American silent short films
American black-and-white films
Silent American Western (genre) films
Films directed by Lorimer Johnston
1910s American films